Anjunabeats Worldwide 04 is the fourth compilation album in the Anjunabeats Worldwide compilation series. It is mixed and compiled by Israeli trance producer Maor Levi and Polish trance producer Nitrous Oxide, and was released on 23 April 2012 on Anjunabeats. The compilation is named after the radio show of the same name, which airs every Sunday evening on the internet radio Digitally Imported.

Track listing

References

Electronic compilation albums
2012 compilation albums
Trance compilation albums